Silke Otto-Knapp (1970–2022) was a German artist. Her work was shown at numerous galleries and shows including the Bienal de São Paulo. the Istanbul Biennial and the Liverpool Biennial.

Otto-Knapp attended the University of Hildesheim and received her MFA from Chelsea College of Art and Design in London. Her landscape paintings are known for being based on historical documentation of stage designs and performances. Her laying watercolor only to wash them down and then apply them anew resulted in a body of work conspicuous for establishing the coexistence of conflicting spaces which give rise to a intrensic tension.

Otto-Knapp has held solo exhibitions at the Renaissance Society, Chicago (2020); the Art Gallery of Ontario, Toronto (2015); the Kunsthalle Wien and the Camden Arts Centre, London (2014); the Kunsthal Charlottenborg, Copenhagen (2013); the Kunstverein Munich (2010); and the Tate Britain, London (2005). 

She died in October 2022 of ovarian cancer.

References 

1970 births
2022 deaths
German women artists
German contemporary artists